Alfonso Camorani (born 21 February 1978) is an Italian football midfielder who plays for A.S.D. Gelbison Cilento Vallo della Lucania. He is 179 cm tall and weighs 72 kg.

Football career
He started his career at Avellino youth team. Her played for Campobasso (Serie D), Ternana, Alzano (Serie B), Teramo (Serie C2) before joined Salernitana of Serie B.

He spent second half of 2002-03 season at Lecce (Serie B) on loan.

On second half of 2003-04 season, Fiorentina, at that time still in Serie B, signed him. He followed Fiorentina promoted to Serie A, but spent his first Serie A season on loan at A.C. Siena. He made his Serie A debut on 12 September 2004, against Palermo.

He then signed by U.S. Lecce for second time. His Serie A career was to end shortly as he followed the club as it was relegated to Serie B in summer 2006.

Treviso
He transferred to Treviso in January 2007, in co-ownership deal for a peppercorn of €500, along with Martin Petráš (loan), in the part of Marcello Cottafava, Blažej Vašcák and Alberto Giuliatto transfer. Next summer he was signed by Spezia.

Pescara
In August 2009 he was loaned to Cassino.

References

External links
http://aic.football.it/scheda/2271/camorani-alfonso.htm

1978 births
Living people
People from Cercola
Italian footballers
U.S. Avellino 1912 players
Ternana Calcio players
U.S. Salernitana 1919 players
U.S. Lecce players
ACF Fiorentina players
A.C.N. Siena 1904 players
Treviso F.B.C. 1993 players
Delfino Pescara 1936 players
A.S.D. Cassino Calcio 1924 players
Virtus Bergamo Alzano Seriate 1909 players
Serie A players
Serie B players
Association football midfielders
Footballers from Campania
Sportspeople from the Province of Naples